Turiasorex is an extinct genus of shrew which existed in east central Spain, during the middle and late Miocene. Its fossils have been recovered from the Calatayud-Daroca and Teruel basins, Spain. It was first named by Jan A. van Dam, Lars W. van den Hoek Ostende and Jelle W. F. Reumer in 2011 and the type species is Turiasorex pierremeini.

References

Shrews
Prehistoric Eulipotyphla
Miocene mammals of Europe
Fossil taxa described in 2011
Prehistoric placental genera